Dobronravov (Russian: Добронравов) is a Russian masculine surname derived from the word combination dobryi and nrav meaning kind temper; its feminine counterpart is Dobronravova . Notable people with the surname include:

Boris Dobronravov (1896–1949), Russian and Soviet actor
Elena Dobronravova (1932–1999), Soviet and Russian actress
Fyodor Dobronravov (born 1961), Russian actor
Ivan Dobronravov (born 1989), Russian actor, son of Fyodor
Nikolai Dobronravov (born 1928), Russian poet and lyricist

References

Russian-language surnames